Gold. is a German experimental short documentary film directed by Alexander Tuschinski. It intercuts abandoned 19th century gold-mining towns in the desert with sequoia trees in a forest. The film had its world premiere at Mykonos Biennale on July 3, 2015, where it was screened in competition and received the Biennale's Golden Pelican Award by Lydia Venieri. It had its German premiere at Berlin Short Film Festival on July 4, 2015, was screened in competition at Braunschweig International Film Festival 2015. and had its US-premiere at Hollywood Reel Independent Film Festival in 2016.

Production 

The film is set to the fourth movement of Beethoven's seventh symphony, which has been called "Apotheosis of Dance" by Richard Wagner. The director's intention was to intercut nature and human structures to show nature overtaking. It was filmed with a tight schedule and the crew travelled long distances in a short amount of time to get many different shots needed. Tuschinski edited the film from six hours of material from "countless camera-angles", as most shots are shown only very briefly due to the often rapid editing. Planning the film, he was inspired by the early works of his friend and mentor Hugo Niebeling that connect cinematography and music in a very direct way.

Reception

Screenings 
The film was screened in competition at the following festivals:
 Mykonos Biennale 2015 (Winner: Golden Pelican Award)
 Berlin Short Film Festival 2015
 Braunschweig International Film Festival 2015
 Berlin Independent Film Festival 2016  
 Hollywood Reel Independent Film Festival 2016

References

External links 
 
 plusinsight: Interview with Alexander Tuschinski about the ideas behind "Gold." (German language)
 plusinsight: Interview with Alexander Tuschinski about "Gold." winning at Mykonos Biennale (German language)

2015 films
2015 short documentary films
German short documentary films
German avant-garde and experimental films
Films directed by Alexander Tuschinski
2010s avant-garde and experimental films
2010s English-language films
2010s German films